Craig Graham Nevill-Manning (né Nevill) is a New Zealand computer scientist who founded Google's first remote engineering center, located in midtown Manhattan, where he was an Engineering Director. He also created Froogle (now Google Shopping), a product search engine. He is now Head of Engineering at Sidewalk Labs.

Academic and professional career
Nevill-Manning graduated with a BSc in computer science from the University of Canterbury. He received his PhD from the University of Waikato where he was a co-creator of the Weka machine learning suite and the Greenstone digital library software. In 1994, he invented the sequitur algorithm, which uses data compression to infer the structure of a sequence of symbols.

Prior to joining Google in 2001 as a senior research scientist, he was an assistant professor in the Computer Science Department at Rutgers University, and was a post-doctoral fellow in the Biochemistry department at Stanford University. His research interests center on using techniques from machine learning, data compression and computational biology to provide more structured search over information.

In 2016, Nevill-Manning joined Alphabet, Inc. subsidiary Sidewalk Labs as CTO.

Awards
In 2010 Nevill-Manning received a distinguished alumni award from the University of Waikato.

In 2009 he won a World Class New Zealand Award in the Information and Communications category.

References

External links
 University of Canterbury graduate profile

American computer scientists
Google employees
Living people
New Zealand computer scientists
University of Canterbury alumni
University of Waikato alumni
Rutgers University faculty
Year of birth missing (living people)
Place of birth missing (living people)
People educated at Marlborough Boys' College